The Vice President of the Republic of Ivory Coast, officially the Republic of Côte d'Ivoire, is the second-highest executive official in Ivory Coast. The vice president is appointed by the president, with the consent of the Parliament, composed of the National Assembly and the Senate. The Ivorian Constitution of 2016 initially provided for the vice president to be elected at the same time as the president by direct universal suffrage, as running mate of the presidential candidate. A constitutional revision announced by Ouattara before the 2020 presidential election, confirms the designation of the vice-president, appointed by the president with the consent of Parliament.

The vice president is the first person in the presidential line of succession and would ascend to the presidency upon the death or resignation of the President, or an absolute vacancy in the office. President Alassane Ouattara appointed Daniel Kablan Duncan as vice president in January 2017 after the 2016 Constitution was enacted.

History
The office of vice president was first created in 1980, but it was abolished in 1985. The adoption of a new constitution in 2016 recreated the office of vice president.

Eligibility
The same provisions of the 2016 Constitution for the president apply to a candidate for election as vice president.

Duties
The duties of the vice president of Ivory Coast are:
 Presiding of various meetings in absence of the president
 Acting President when the President is out of the country
 ascend to the presidency upon the death or resignation of the president, or an absolute vacancy in the office

List

Key
Political parties

Other factions

Officeholders

References

Ivory Coast
Vice-Presidents